The 2013–14 season was the 113th season of competitive association football and the 87th season in the Football League played by Tranmere Rovers Football Club, a professional football club based in Birkenhead, Wirral.

Background and pre-season

League One

League table

Results by matchday

Matches

FA Cup

Football League Cup

Football League Trophy

Players
Transfers, contract extensions and loans are listed from the last day of the previous season till the final day of this season

Transfers

Contract extensions

Loans

Season statistics

† Statuses are mentioned for youth academy players without senior contract and players who were signed on non-contract basis or on loan. Dates joined and left are mentioned only for players who changed club between the first and the last matchday of the season.

References 

2013-14
2013–14 Football League One by team